The Concordia University System (CUS) is an organization of seven colleges and universities and one satellite campus in the United States that are operated by the Lutheran Church–Missouri Synod (LCMS). All of the institutions are named "Concordia"—a reference to the Latin title of The Book of Concord, the collection of Lutheran confessions—and all include professional church work programs as part of their curricula. The CUS was formed in 1992. , 28,421 students attend Concordia University System institutions.

Each Concordia except the one in Ann Arbor, Michigan, is independent and has its own president, faculty, and board of regents; Concordia University Ann Arbor is now a satellite campus of Concordia University Wisconsin. At the same time, the schools interact with one another and share some resources and services. One service offered by the CUS, the Simultaneous Enrollment Program, allows any student enrolled at one Concordia to attend another CUS college for up to a year as a "visiting student". During that time, visiting students are considered to be enrolled at both CUS institutions simultaneously.

The 2019 convention of the LCMS passed Resolution 7-03 to create a new governance model for the schools. In February 2021, a committee appointed the synod's board of directors tentatively proposed a new model under which each school's board of regents and administration would be responsible for its own property and business matters, while the CUS would be replaced with a Commission on University Education which would govern the "ecclesiastical functions and connections of the schools" and would establish "ecclesiastical accreditation process". The plan is not complete and the committee is receiving comments from interested parties in the LCMS.

Member institutions
The seven campuses in the Concordia University System are:
Concordia University Ann Arbor in Ann Arbor, Michigan
Concordia University Texas in Austin, Texas
Concordia University Chicago in River Forest, Illinois
Concordia University Irvine in Irvine, California
Concordia University, Saint Paul in Saint Paul, Minnesota
Concordia University, Nebraska in Seward, Nebraska
Concordia University Wisconsin in Mequon, Wisconsin

Concordia University Ann Arbor merged with Concordia University Wisconsin in 2013. Several former members of CUS have closed: Concordia College Alabama, in Selma, Alabama, closed in 2018, Concordia University in Portland, Oregon, closed in 2020, and Concordia College–New York in Bronxville, New York, closed in 2021.

Non-member institutions
There are several educational institutions named "Concordia" that are not part of the Concordia University System. For example, neither of the LCMS seminaries (Concordia Seminary and Concordia Theological Seminary) are part of CUS. The non-accredited Concordia College and University is in no way affiliated with the Concordia University System or its nine campuses.

The educational institutions of the Lutheran Church–Canada are not part of the CUS even though that church body was originally part of the LCMS and remains associated with it. Those institutions are Concordia University of Edmonton and Concordia Lutheran Seminary, both in Edmonton, and Concordia Lutheran Theological Seminary in St. Catharines (which is affiliated with Brock University).

Other Concordias that are affiliated with neither the CUS nor the LCMS include Concordia College in Moorhead, Minnesota, and Concordia University in Montreal.

See also
California Concordia College in Oakland, which closed in 1973
Concordia College (Indiana) in Fort Wayne, which closed in 1957
Concordia College (North Carolina) in Conover, which closed in 1935
Concordia Senior College in Fort Wayne, Indiana, which closed in 1977
St. John's College (Kansas) in Winfield, Kansas, which closed in 1986
List of Lutheran colleges and universities

References

External links

Educational institutions established in 1992
1992 establishments in the United States